The Oruç Reis-class submarines were ordered by the Turkish Navy from the British company Vickers in 1939. They were similar to the British S-class submarines, but slightly smaller. They had the S-class machinery but only four bow torpedo tubes. The four boats were requisitioned by the Royal Navy on the outbreak of World War II and fought in the British fleet as the P611 class. Two submarines were delivered to the Turks in 1942 in order to bolster Turkish strength against the threat from Nazi Germany and the remaining surviving submarine was delivered to the Turkish Navy after the end of the war in 1945. P615 had been sunk in 1943. The three Turkish boats were scrapped in 1957.

P614 and P615 appear in the film We Dive at Dawn as HMS Sea Tiger.

Ships
All were built by Vickers in Barrow-in-Furness.

See also
  A World War I warship paid for by Imperial Turkey but seized by the Royal Navy upon outbreak of war.
  Another World War I warship paid for by Imperial Turkey but seized by the Royal Navy upon outbreak of war.

References

External links

 page from uboat.net

Submarine classes
 
Ships built in Barrow-in-Furness
World War II submarines of Turkey
World War II submarines of the United Kingdom